John Gerald Breheny (17 May 1910 – 11 February 2009) was an Australian politician.

He was born in Toowoomba in Queensland. In 1951 he was elected to the Tasmanian House of Assembly as a Liberal member for Darwin (later Braddon) in a recount following Jack Chamberlain's resignation. He served until his defeat in 1972, and was then an Ulverstone councillor from 1976 to 1991. During his time on Ulverstone council, he was noted for publicly stating that "gay community are no better than Saddam Hussein". He died at Ulverstone in 2009.

References

1910 births
2009 deaths
Liberal Party of Australia members of the Parliament of Tasmania
Members of the Tasmanian House of Assembly
20th-century Australian politicians